The following is a timeline of the history of the city of Fresno, California, USA.

19th century

 1856 – Fresno County formed in 1856 with Millerton, a settlement along the San Joaquin River, as the county seat.
 1865 – William Helm brings his wife and his sheep to the valley floor area south of Millerton.
 1870 - Weekly Expositor newspaper in publication.
 1872 – Fresno station founded by the Central Pacific Railroad Company
 1874 – County seat of Fresno County moves from Millerton to Fresno due to population growth.
 1875
 Fresno County Courthouse built.
 Central California Colony established south of Fresno, creating a successful model for attracting settlers. 
 1876 – Fresno Morning Republican newspaper in publication. 
 1877 – Fresno Volunteer Fire Department organized.
 1881 - William Helm bought the block bounded by Fresno, R, Merced and S Streets from Louis Einstein.
 1882 – St. John Church built.
 1884 – Big Fresno Fair begins.
 1885 – Fresno incorporated.
 1889 – Meux Home built.
 1890
 Barton opera house opens.
 Population exceeds 10,000.
 1892 - Street cars introduced  
 1893 – Fresno Free Public Library opens.
 1894
 Fresno Parlor Lecture Club organized.
 Fresno Water Tower built.
 San Francisco-Fresno bike messenger service (during the Pullman Strike) initiated.
 1899 – Santa Fe Passenger Depot opens.
 1900 – Population: 12,470.

20th century

1900s–1940s

 1901
 Fresno City Railway in operation.
 Fresno Buddhist Temple founded.
 1904 – Gottschalks shop in business. 
 1904 - First Butcher Shop Opened by Andrew David Green
 1906 – Forestiere Underground Gardens begin developing.
 1908 – Asparēz Armenian/English-language newspaper begins publication.
 1909 – Raisin Day festival begins.
 1910 – Fresno Junior College opens.
 1911
Fresno State Normal School founded.
Sunnyside Country Club opens.
 1913 – Commercial Club organized.
 1914 – Holy Trinity Church built.
 1918
 Sun-Maid raisin facility begins operating.
 Bank of Italy building constructed.
 1919 – Fresno Historical Society and Temple Beth Israel founded.
 1921 – Fresno State College established.
 1922 - KMJ 580AM Radio begins broadcasting.
 1922 – Fresno Bee newspaper begins publication.
 1923
 Fort Washington Golf and Country Club established.
 San Joaquin Light and Power Corporation Building constructed.
 1925 – Security Pacific Bank Building constructed.
 1926 – Fresno State Stadium dedicated.
 1928 – Pantages Theater opens.
 1929
 Roeding Park Zoo opens.
 Z. S. Leymel becomes mayor.
 Chandler Airport opens as area's primary airport.
 1932 – Fresno Memorial Auditorium built.
 1935 – Academy (social group) formed.
 1939 – Tower Theatre opens.
 1942 – U.S. Air Force Hammer Airfield and Japanese American internment camp in use.
 1944 – Pacific Bible Institute founded.
 1946 – Sierra Sky Park Airport residential aviation community established near city.
 1947 – Hammer Field National Guard training area and Fresno Air Terminal established, becoming primary hub of commercial aviation instead of Chandler Airport.
 1948 – Azteca Theater built.

1950s–1990s

 1954 – Peoples Church and Fresno Philharmonic  founded.
 1955 – Bernice F. Sisk becomes U.S. representative for California's 12th congressional district.
 1960 – Mexican American Political Association founded.
 1961 – City of Fresno Takes over municipal bus service.
 1962 – Farm Workers Association founding meeting held in Fresno.
 1964
 Fulton Mall dedicated.
 1966
 Fresno Convention Center complex built.
 Fresno County Courthouse rebuilt.
 1967 – Catholic Diocese of Fresno established.
 1968 - Woodward Park opened in north Fresno.
 1969 – Kiddie Kinema movie theatre opens. 
 1970
 Fashion Fair Mall in business.
 Population: 167,927.
 1973 – Good Company Players founded.
 1977 – KMTF television begins broadcasting.
 1983 – Fresno Metronews begins publication.
 1984
Nanaksar Gurdwara founded.
Fresno Metropolitan Museum established.
 1989
 Fresno Municipal Sanitary Landfill closes.
 Karen Humphrey becomes mayor.
 1990
 Vida en el Valle Spanish/English-language newspaper begins publication.
 Population: 354,202.
 1992 – Hmong Times newspaper in publication.
 1993
 Hmong Today (television program) begins broadcasting.
 San Joaquin Valley Heritage & Genealogy Center established.
 Jim Patterson becomes mayor.
 1996 – Tahoe Joe's restaurant in business.
 1997
 Community Food Bank active.
 River Park shopping center in business.
 1998
 City website online.
 Fresno Grizzlies baseball team formed.
 Fresno Stadium 22 cinema opens.
 2000
 University High School established.
 Mormon Fresno California Temple dedicated.

21st century

2001
 Alan Autry becomes Mayor
 2002
 Grizzlies Stadium opens.
 2003
 Save Mart Center (arena) opens.
 Ani-Jam anime convention begins.
 2005
 Woodward Shakespeare Festival and Artists' Repertory Theatre founded.
 Jim Costa becomes U.S. representative for California's 20th congressional district.
 Coyle United States Courthouse built.
 2008 – Neighborhood Thrift shop in business.
 2009 – Ashley Swearengin becomes mayor.
 2010
 Fresno Metropolitan Museum closes.
 Population reaches 494,665 people.
 2013 – Poet laureate inaugurated.
 2014 
 Bitwise Industries launches, bringing a technology and entrepreneur community together. Starts with Bitwise Mural District, and more Fresno campuses follow.
Fresno General Plan adopted, becoming the first one in decades to not expand the Sphere of Influence.
 2015 
 On January 6, Governor Jerry Brown attends a groundbreaking ceremony for California High-Speed Rail in downtown Fresno at the future location of Fresno's High Speed Rail Station.
 Fresno Declares Drought; worst recorded precipitation levels; 130 years. Water Use Reduction/Conservation Begins.
 2017 – Fresno shootings.
 2020
 Population reaches 542,161 people.
 2021 
 Former Police Chief Jerry Dyer becomes Fresno's 26th mayor.

See also
 History of Fresno
 National Register of Historic Places listings in Fresno County, California
 Timelines of other cities in the Northern California area of California: Mountain View, Oakland, Sacramento, San Francisco, San Jose

References

Further reading

Books

Published in the 19th century
 
 
 
 
 

Published in the 20th century
 
 

 
 
 
 

 Waiczis, Michael R., and William B. Secrest, Jr. A Portrait of Fresno, 1885–1985: A Publication of the Centennial History Committee. Fresno: Centennial History Committee, 1985.

 
 
 

Published in the 21st century

Periodicals

 
 "Fresno Past and Present", Quarterly Journal of the Fresno City and County Historical Society. Fresno: The Society, 1959-
 
  (about Fresno's Southeast Growth Area)
  (series of articles about Fresno)

Travel guides

External links

 
 Items related to Fresno, various dates (via Digital Public Library of America)
 Materials related to Fresno, California, various dates (via US Library of Congress, Prints & Photos Division)

History of Fresno, California
fresno